Ori Yogev (born November 3, 1960) is an Israeli businessman who served as the appointed head of the Budget Division in the Ministry of Finance between 2002 and 2004.  Between 2009 and 2010 he served as Chairman of the Israel National Economic Council Advisory Committee. From 2013 to 2017 Yogev served as director of the Government Companies Authority. Yogev lives in Modi'in-Maccabim-Re'ut and is married with five children.

Biography
Yogev was born in Safed to parents who worked in the public sector. His father worked in the Department of Agriculture and his mother worked for the Tel Aviv Municipality. His childhood was spent in Haifa and Tel Aviv where he attended the Alliance High School. In the IDF he served as a captain in the Intelligence Corps.

Yogev has a Bachelor of Arts in Economics from Tel Aviv University and a Master of Arts cum laude in Economics from The Hebrew University of Jerusalem.  He began his career in the Ministry of Finance at age 26 working as a referent in the area of subsidies and government imports. Within a year, he was appointed senior adviser to the director of The Ministry of Finance, a position he held until leaving in 1990.

Between 1990 and 1993 Yogev managed the Jerusalem district as Vice-President of "Ha Magen" insurance company. Between 1993 and 2001 he was CEO of 'Ha'saneh' insurance company downsized. Between 1994 and 1997 he served as CEO of 'Omni Food' Brands, a 'Domino's Pizza' franchise and 'Häagen-Dazs'. During this period he succeeded in significantly boosting the activities of the pizzeria chain.

Between 1997 and 2001 he was CEO of 'Bezeq International', a period characterized by the opening of the market to competition in international calling and the company entered the field of internet access provision.

Ministry of Finance
In 2002 Yogev was appointed by then Finance Minister Silvan Shalom as head of the Budget Division – the highest public sector position in the economic field. He served in this position until April 2004. His appointment coincided with a recession in Israel's economy due to the high-tech crash and the Second Intifada. The treasury worked to pass legislation for the Emergency Economic Plan, and under the leadership of Benjamin Netanyahu, who replaced Shalom in 2003, pursued a liberal economic policy. This included extensive cuts in government spending and comprehensive reforms. Yogev led both the drafting and implementation of these reforms.

During his tenure, automatic increases in governmental budgets by means of indices such as linkage and natural population growth were revoked and replaced by a law that capped annual budget growth at 1%. Welfare benefits were linked to the CPI (Consumer Price Index) instead of an average salary, child allowances were reduced and the budgetary pension of civil servants was replaced by a cumulative pension. The retirement age was raised, and the number of public sector workers reduced. The Labor Union (Histadrut) pension funds were also nationalized. According to Yogev, the overall plan implemented in this period was based on the approach not to harm the wealthier echelons (so that they would not leave the country), while the period of recession in these years was used to promote the reduction of organized labor in the economy.

After his departure, Yogev continued to serve for several months as a consultant to the treasury which led to the ports reform – a reform that he had championed during his tenure. Yogev is regarded as Benjamin Netanyahu's economic ideologue.

Private business
In 2004, Yogev began representing Australian businessman John Gandel's investments in Israel. His activities included investment in Plastro Irrigation Systems, the public company controlled by Kibbutz Gvat. Yogev was appointed as executive chairman of the company, until the Gandel Group's shares were sold to the John Deere company twenty months later.

From 2005 to 2007, working on behalf of the Kibbutz Lohamei HaGeta'ot, Yogev led partnership negotiations between Osem and Tivol, as well as the sale of the kibbutz's stake to Nestlé.

Water technologies
In recent years, Yogev has focused on the water and cleantech industries in Israel. Yogev founded Waterfronts – Israel Water Alliance, and continues to serve as chairman of the association. The association works to promote Israel's status as a global leader in advanced water solutions.

In 2006, he established Whitewater Holdings, operating in the field of water quality and control and investing in developing technologies to ensure the quality and safety of drinking water. Whitewater provides a comprehensive and synergistic environment, servicing municipalities. Its mission is to help municipalities and water authorities guarantee a constant supply of quality water, by optimizing the production, management, control and delivery of water through the synergistic application of the latest water technologies. Following the realization of his holdings in Plastro, Yogev purchased Gandel's part in the company and brought in businesswoman Hanna Gertler as a partner.

Whitewater Holdings has three subsidiaries: Whitewater Technologies (integrated management, optimization and analytics), which holds a daughter company located in Akron USA, Galcon (smart irrigation and pressure management) and CheckLight (toxicity analyzer).

In April 2013, Whitewater Technologies was chosen by Bloomberg as one of 10 companies named the 2013 New Energy Pioneer. A team of independent experts chose the ten winning companies from over 200 candidates, in the energy, water and clean-tech sector. The selection committee stated the winners as "representing the technology and business model innovation which will enable the transformation to a more resource efficient economy environment". The selection was made based on three criteria – innovation, proven momentum in its field and potential for global deployment.

Chairman of the National Economic Council Advisory Committee and Chairman of Israel Railways
In 2009, Yogev was appointed as Chairman of National Economic Council Advisory Committee and to the Prime Minister and lead the financial program and the Package deal with the Israeli Labor Union (Histadrut).
  
In that year, The Marker magazine ranked Yogev ninth in its list of the most influential people in the Israeli economy, based on his tenure as a consultant to Prime Minister Benjamin Netanyahu (Chairman of the National Economic Advisory Council and to the Prime Minister).

Chairman of Israel Railways 
In 2010 Yogev became one of the architects of the 'Israel Ways' program for massive development of the Israel Railways' infrastructure. The plan was approved by the Netanyahu government, and Yogev was appointed as chairman of its Advisory Committee and chairman of the Railway Board till mid 2013.
During his tenure as chairman, a profound change of personnel structure took place and the chairman of the committee, Gila Edrei, was dismissed.

General Manager of the Government Companies Authority 
from September 2013 to September 2017 Yogev served as the general manager of the Government Companies Authority.

In his capacity as director of the Government Companies Authority, Yogev initiated the reform in government companies. The purpose of the reform, which is based on the OECD's concept of managing government companies, is to transform government companies into a property for them, while improving the efficiency and level of service they provide to citizens in Israel.

The government companies that lost NIS 600 million in 2013 went to an aggregate profit of NIS 2.6 billion in 2016 and are expected to earn more than NIS 3 billion in 2017, with all major government companies earning the first time.

In November 2013, the Directors' team was launched, which was aimed at ending the political involvement in government companies.

For the 2014 team came 13,795 candidates, of whom 500 were selected finalists. About 7,100 candidates went to the 2015 team, of whom the 500 finalists recommended to government ministers were located. The number of directors of 2017 was 9,266, of which 400 candidates were added to the 500 candidates from the previous year's board of directors. As of 2017, the 250 elected directors are the elected candidates.

Since the establishment of the Directors' team, the number of women represented on boards of directors has risen to fifty percent. In addition, ten percent of directors belong to minority groups. A report prepared by the Government Companies Authority indicated that since the establishment of the directors' team, the percentage of family members in government companies has fallen by 80%.

Macro Economics Doctrine
Yogev supports extensive scaling back and privatization of the public sector as well as the transfer of government controlled activities and assets to the private sector. According to this approach, the state should buy services (including social services and education) from private companies rather than provide them. Yogev aggressively opposes the existence of monopolies, including government monopolies, and has called for the dismantling of the Israel Lands Administration and the transfer of land in its possession to private ownership. In addition, the breaking of the monopoly of the largest commercial banks. However, he declared that even a privately owned monopoly is preferable to a government-controlled entity.

Yogev was responsible for drastically cutting allowances in the first decade of the 21st century, but also for supporting the Wisconsin plan encouraging work by reducing benefits, and investment in the transportation infrastructure. He called for the cancellation of the collective agreements with teachers and for enabling school administrators to hire teachers with private contracts and to purchase teaching services from private companies. He supported the separation of water and sewage departments of local authorities, and the establishment of independent water and sewage corporations.

Yogev is aggressively opposed to the existence of organized labor, and sees it as a burden on the economy and the leading cause of mediocrity and lack of professionalism. He said that there is no need for organized labor in Israel, since the state takes responsibility for maintaining the rights of employees, while the Labour Union mainly protects the major labor committees, but not workers in small companies and businesses.

References

External links
 Recent publications about Whitewater Group
 Whitewater equipment was implemented in Hagihon Corporation in Jerusalem
 Deputy Legal Advisor has approved the appointment of Yogev as chairman of Israel Railways, Calcalist.
 Ori Yogev raised NIS 22 million, Calcalist.
 Rafi Rosenfeld, interview: The optimistic side of Netanyahu's economic ideologue NRG Maariv, June 25, 2010.
 Interview with Ori Yogev Eretz Acheret Magazine.
 Articles by Ori Yogev, TheMarker.

Israeli businesspeople
1960 births
Living people
Tel Aviv University alumni
Hebrew University of Jerusalem Faculty of Social Sciences alumni